Soulhead Tour 2006: Naked (stylized as SOULHEAD tour 2006 "Naked") is Soulhead's second DVD and first concert DVD. The tour was in correspondence with their 2006 album Naked, and was their first tour. The version on the DVD was performed at SHIBUYA-AX. The DVD also contained an alternate music video for One more time, which was previously released on the album.

It was released on both DVD and Blu-ray.

Track listing
(Official Track List)
"Birth" (Intro)
"Fiesta"
"Got to leave"
"Don't U Think?" 
"Yume no Uchi"
"Forgive me"
"Itsudemo Kimi no Koto wo" 
"Step to the New World"
"At the Party"
"Nature" (Interlude)
"Touch" (Interlude)
"WHACHAGONADO?"
"XXX"
"One more time"
"Sparkle☆Train"
"Furusato"
"Anata"
"Pray"
"Sora"
"One more time"(Special Additional Clip)

References

2006 video albums
Sony Music Entertainment Japan albums
Live video albums